Luxury Escapes is an online travel agency for lodging and airfare reservations, with more than 3.2 million members across Australia, New Zealand, Singapore, India, Hong Kong, the US and the UK, offering limited-time travel packages at discounted prices.

Luxury Escapes is owned by Lux Group Limited, a privately-owned business based in Melbourne which was founded in 2009 by Jeremy Same and Adam Schwab. Lux Group has more than 250 team members globally, with offices in Sydney, Melbourne, Bangalore and Singapore. In addition to Luxury Escapes, Lux Group is a party to a joint venture which houses the Scoopon, Cudo and TreatMe brands.

Luxury Escapes is a member of IATA.

Partnerships 
Luxury Escapes' partnership with Qantas allows Australian members to link their Luxury Escapes account to their Qantas Frequent Flyer, Singapore Airlines’ KrisFlyer and Club Vistara accounts to earn frequent flyer points on eligible Luxury Escapes holiday spend .

Mobile App 
Luxury Escapes has iOS and Android mobile applications, enabling users to access their bookings and purchase deals via their mobile device.

Buy Now, Choose Dates Later 
Since offers on Luxury Escapes are available for purchase for a limited time period only, members have the option of purchasing their holiday packages during that timeframe, and choosing their dates at a later stage when they're ready to schedule their holiday.

Gift Cards 
Luxury Escapes Gift Cards can be purchased online or within Australia, at Woolworths supermarkets and Big W retail stores. Gift Card denominations range from $50-$5,000 and can be used to purchase Luxury Escapes packages (excluding airfare).

References

Travel agencies
Travel and holiday companies of Australia
Companies based in Melbourne